is a compilation album by Japanese entertainer Akina Nakamori, released through Universal Music Japan on August 6, 2014. The compilation album is divided into two discs: The first disc includes 15 singles from the Warner Pioneer period and the second disc contains 15 singles from the MCA Records and UMJ eras. It also includes the bonus track "Crazy Love", which was previously released only as a digital single, as well as the new single "Sweet Rain."

The album was released in regular and first-press editions. The first-press edition includes a DVD containing short footage of the acoustic live tour . The Special Edition includes the full version of the acoustic live tour.

Charting performance
The album debuted at No. 3 on Oricon's weekly albums chart and remained in the same position for two consecutive weeks, charted for 39 weeks and became the 46th best sold album in the year. It was certified Gold by RIAJ.

Track listing

Charts
Weekly charts

Year-end charts

Certification

References

External links
 
 
 

2014 compilation albums
Akina Nakamori compilation albums
Japanese-language compilation albums
Universal Music Japan compilation albums